A Bachelor of Design (B.Des. or B.Design) degree is usually an undergraduate academic degree in the field of design awarded for a course or major that generally lasts three or four years. It is the undergraduate equivalent of the Master of Design, MDes. Bachelor of Design degrees have been popular in Canada and Australia for several decades and are becoming increasingly popular in the United States as discipline-specific design education expands and becomes more specialized. There are several variants of the Bachelor of Design degree, including the Bachelor of Design Arts and the Bachelor of Design Studies.

Examples
Examples of B.Des. degrees include:
Bachelor of Design: Architecture. This is an undergraduate degree focusing on Architecture that prepares students for advanced study in Architecture. It is not however recognized by the National Council of Architectural Registration Boards (NCARB) as a professional architectural degree as are the Bachelor of Architecture or Master of Architecture degrees.
Bachelor of Design: Interior design
Bachelor of Design Advertising 
Bachelor of Design: Fashion design
Bachelor of Design: Graphic design
Bachelor of Design: Game design
Bachelor of Design: Multimedia design
Bachelor of Design: Audiovisual Media
Bachelor of Design: Textile Design
Bachelor of Design: Jewelry and Metalsmithing
Bachelor of Design: Industrial design. In the United States, the National Association of Schools of Art and Design (NASAD) which accredits most industrial design programs does not distinguish between the Bachelor of Design: Industrial Design and the older Bachelor of Industrial Design (BID) degree which has been awarded since the 1970s. Certification of Industrial Design degree programs by the Industrial Designers Society of America (IDSA) has been proposed but does not currently exist.
Bachelor of Design: Visual communications design
Bachelor of Design: Product Design
Bachelor of Design: Design and Digital Arts
Bachelor of Design: Interaction Design
Bachelor of Design: Interior Architecture

References

Design